Gran Alegria (foaled 24 January 2016) is a Japanese Thoroughbred racehorse. After winning a minor race on her debut in 2018 she won the Saudi Arabia Royal Cup before running third in the Asahi Hai Futurity Stakes. On her first appearance as a three-year-old she won the Oka Sho. In 2020 and 2021 she was the dominator in sprinter and mile races in Japan, whilst also challenged mid-distance races in between. She won the Yasuda Kinen, Sprinters Stakes, Victoria Mile and Mile Championship, with the latter one winning twice.

Background
Gran Alegria is a bay mare with a white star bred in Japan by Northern Farm. During her racing career she has carried the colours of Sunday Racing and has been trained by Kazuo Fujisawa. The filly has been ridden in most of her races by Christophe Lemaire.

She was from the ninth crop of foals sired by Deep Impact, who was the Japanese Horse of the Year in 2005 and 2006, winning races including the Tokyo Yushun, Tenno Sho, Arima Kinen and Japan Cup. Deep Impact's other progeny include Gentildonna, Harp Star, Kizuna, A Shin Hikari, Marialite and Saxon Warrior. Gran Alegria's dam Tapitsfly was a top class American racemare whose wins included the Breeders' Cup Juvenile Fillies Turf, Just A Game Stakes and First Lady Stakes. She was exported to Japan after being sold for $1,850,000 at the Fasig-Tipton sale. She was a female-line descendant of Pink Dove, who was a half-sister to Golden Pheasant.

Racing career

2018: two-year-old season
Gran Alegria made her racecourse debut in a maiden race over 1600 metres at Tokyo Racecourse on 3 June and won by two lengths from fourteen opponents headed by Danon Fantasy. After a four-month break the filly returned for the Grade 3 Saudi Arabia Royal Cup over the same course and distance on 6 October when she was matched against male opposition. Starting the 3/10 favourite she came home three and a half lengths clear of the colt De Gaulle. Instead of contesting Japan's premier race for two-year-old fillies, the Hanshin Juvenile Fillies (which was won in her absence by Danon Fantasy), Gran Alegria faced the colts again in the Asahi Hai Futurity Stakes over 1600 metres at Hanshin Racecourse on 16 December and was made the 1/2 favourite. After racing in second place for most of the way she disputed the lead with Admire Mars in the straight before fading in the final strides and coming home third behind Admire Mars and the 76/1 outsider Kurino Gaudí.

2019: three-year-old season
Gran Alegria began her second campaign in the Grade 1 Oka Sho over 2000 metres at Hanshin on 6 April in which she started the 2.4/1 second favourite behind Danon Fantasy. The other sixteen runners included Chrono Genesis (Daily Hai Queen Cup) as well as No One and Pourville who had run a dead-heat in the Fillies' Revue. After racing in fourth behind the front-running Pourville, Gran Alegria took the lead entering the straight, broke clear of the field and came home two and a half lengths clear of Shigeru Pink Dia. Her winning time of 1:32.7 broke the race record set by Almond Eye in 2018. Christophe Lemaire commented "She certainly won strongly today. I was a little bit worried as it was her first time out after a long break. She was unable to make use of her speed in the Asahi Hai Futurity  so I made sure this time to secure a good position early on and from there I had every confidence in her exceptional speed."

On 5 May Gran Alegria was matched against colts again when she was dropped back in distance for the NHK Mile Cup over 1600 metres at Tokyo and started the odds-on favourite. After tracking the leaders she kept on the straight but was unable to quicken in the closing stages and came home fourth behind Admire Mars. She was subsequently relegated to fifth for causing interference. The filly did not return to the track until 21 December when she was matched against older horses in the 1400 metre Hanshin Cup and started the 1.1/1 favourite. Lemaire settled Gran Alegria in mid-division before moving to the front 200 metres from the finish and pulling clear to win by five lengths from the five-year-old Fiano Romano.

In January 2020, at the JRA Awards for 2019, Gran Alegria took the JRA Award for Best Three-Year-Old Filly, taking 121 of the 274 votes to win from Loves Only You and Chrono Genesis.

2020: four-year-old season
The 2020 flat racing season in Japan was impacted by the COVID-19 pandemic and most events took place behind closed doors. For her first run of the year Gran Alegria was dropped back to sprint distances for the Grade 1 Takamatsunomiya Kinen over 1200 metres at Chukyo Racecourse on 29 March in which she was ridden by Kenichi Ikezoe and started at the 3.1/1 second favourite. After racing towards the rear of the field on the outside she produced a strong late run and in a four-way photo finish she finished third behind Kurino Gaudi and Mozu Superflare (beaten a short head by the winner) with Diatonic taking fourth place. She was promoted to second when Kurino Gaudi was disqualified for causing interference in the closing stages. On 7 June at Tokyo, with Ikezoe again in the saddle, Gran Alegria went off the 11/1 third choice behind Almond Eye and Indy Champ for the 70th running of the Grade 1 Yasuda Kinen over 1600 metres. The other eleven contenders included Danon Premium, Admire Mars, Normcore, Mr Melody (2019 Takamatsunomiya Kinen), Persian Knight (Mile Championship) and Keiai Nautique (2018 NHK Mile Cup). Gran Alegria settled behind the leading group as Danon Smash set the pace before moving into contention on the outside on the final turn. She took the lead approaching the last 200 metres and broke clear of her rivals to win by two and a half lengths from Almond Eye, who got the better of Indy Champ and Normcore in a close finish for second place. After the race Ikezoe said "I was focused on keeping her in good rhythm and in a good position which all worked out beautifully. She just gave her best with such a tenacious run down the stretch. I was afraid up to the line that we were going to be caught, especially by Almond Eye. I hurt myself when a chunk of grass hit my eye at the third corner, but it doesn't hurt at all now!"

After a summer break of almost five months Gran Alegria took on the specialist sprinters for the second time in the Grade 1 Sprinters Stakes over 1200 metres at Nakayama Racecourse on 4 October. Ridden by Lemaire, she started the 1.2/1 favourite against fifteen opponents including Danon Smash, Mozu Superflare, Mr Melody, Diatonic and Kurino Gaudi. Gran Alegria started slowly and was in fifteenth place as she move to the outside on the final turn, but then "mowed down" the opposition, took the lead 50 metres from the finish and won by two lengths from Danon Smash. Lemaire commented "I can't believe how strong she is! She was a little slow to get into the rhythm and we were much further back than expected but we did not panic... she certainly showed what she is made of."

On 22 November at Hanshin Gran Alegria started the 0.6/1 favourite for the 37th running of the Mile Championship in a seventeen-runner field which also included Salios, Indy Champ, Resistencia, Admire Mars, Lauda Sion and Persian Knight. She started well and settled behind the leaders as Resistencia set a steady pace before making a forward move approaching the final turn but appeared to be boxed in and unlikely to obtain a clear run in the straight. She had to be switched to the outside to find room to race but then produced a strong burst of acceleration to gain the advantage in the final strides and won by three quarters of a length from Indy Champ. After the race Lemaire said "She's matured and a lot easier to ride now being a four-year-old so she was relaxed and we had a good trip until the last turn where, as a favorite you're marked and it so happens, but we weren’t able to make our move to the outside smoothly for the stretch run. I was a little worried but the way she exploded into gear in the last 150 meters, it just shows how powerful she is."

In January 2021 Gran Alegria was voted Best Sprinter or Miler at the JRA Awards for 2020. In the 2020 World's Best Racehorse Rankings, Gran Alegria was rated on 121, making her the equal 34th best racehorse in the world.

Pedigree

References

2016 racehorse births
Racehorses bred in Japan
Racehorses trained in Japan
Thoroughbred family 3-o